In electronics, a signal edge is a transition of a digital signal from low to high or from high to low:

 A rising edge (or positive edge) is the low-to-high transition.
 A falling edge (or negative edge) is the high-to-low transition.

In the case of a pulse, which consists of two edges:

 The leading edge (or front edge) is the first edge of the pulse.
 The trailing edge (or back edge) is the second edge of the pulse.

See also
Flip-flop (electronics), an edge-triggered circuit
Rise time, for a signal transition

References

Digital electronics